James Houston Spence, (September 3, 1867 – February 21, 1939) was a Canadian lawyer and Senator.

Spence was born in Greenock Township, Ontario and attended school in London, Ontario and Walkerton, Ontario. He graduated from Osgoode Hall Law School before being called to the bar. He was elected a Bencher of the Law Society of Upper Canada in 1917, named King's Counsel in 1922 and was the senior partner in the law firm of Spence, Shoemaker and Spence.

He specialized in corporate, commercial and municipal law.

He was active in the Liberal Party of Canada, campaigned on behalf of various Liberal candidates in provincial and federal elections, and was a close friend of Sir Wilfrid Laurier as well as a friend of William Lyon Mackenzie King who appointed him to the Senate in 1928.

Spence served in the Hamilton Regiment from 1890 to 1893. He was also a member of the Masonic Order.

He died at his home in Toronto on February 21, 1939.

References

External links
 

1867 births
1939 deaths
Canadian senators from Ontario
Liberal Party of Canada senators
Lawyers in Ontario
Canadian people of Scottish descent
Canadian King's Counsel